Minc, MINC, or MinC may refer to:

 MINC, a data specification language.
 MinC, one of three proteins encoded by the minB operon
 Alain Minc (1949–), French businessman, political advisor, and author
 Carlos Minc (1951–), Brazilian geographer and politician
 Hilary Minc (1905–1974), Polish economist and member of Communist Party of Poland
 Ministério da Cultura (MinC), Brazil's Culture of Ministry
 MINC-11 computer, a PDP-11/03 or PDP-11/23 computer for laboratory applications